Thorius lunaris, commonly known as the crescent-nostriled thorius, is a species of salamander in the family Plethodontidae. It is endemic to Pico de Orizaba, in Veracruz, Mexico, at elevations of  asl. Its natural habitat is pine-oak forest where it occurs under the bark of stumps and fallen logs, in leaf-litter, and in piles of wood chips. This was formerly very abundant species is now very rare. It is threatened by habitat loss caused by logging and expanding agriculture.

References

Thorius
Endemic amphibians of Mexico
Fauna of the Trans-Mexican Volcanic Belt
Taxonomy articles created by Polbot
Amphibians described in 1998